Manuel González (born 28 January 1950) is a Cuban fencer. He competed in the individual and team épée events at the 1968 Summer Olympics.

References

1950 births
Living people
Cuban male fencers
Olympic fencers of Cuba
Fencers at the 1968 Summer Olympics
Sportspeople from Havana